Wavebob was a wave energy converter which was in development between 1999 and 2013 when the company was closed owing to funding difficulties.  

It commenced the first of a number of sea trials in Galway Bay in Ireland during which it was tested as a 1/4 scale device for short periods at the SEAI 1/4 Scale Wave Power Testing facility which is located in the inner bay inside the natural Aran Islands breakwater and where devices under test are exposed to c.1/3 of the expected energy of the 'Full Atlantic Ocean'.

Technology
Wavebob used the lift and fall of ocean waves to drive generators 

The Wavebob consisted of two oscillating structures. These structures must be able to absorb in a variety of conditions and be robust to survive in the harsh marine environment. The structures are controlled by a damping system that can respond to predicted wave height, wave power and frequency. The tank structure (a semi-submerged body) uses captured sea water mass as the majority of its inertial mass. This significantly reduces the cost associated with structural materials.

Wavebob developed its business through an Open Innovation Model and was partnered with leading energy companies such as Chevron and Vattenfall. It briefly established a joint venture company with Vattenfall called Tonn Energy to develop commercial wave farms off the west coast of Ireland.

Company milestones
1999: Original patents filed

2007: CEO appointed; head office in Maynooth established

2013: Company Closed Down.

See also
Wave farm
Maritime Research Institute Netherlands
Marine Institute Ireland
Pelamis Wave Energy Converter
OE buoy

References

Further reading
 Falnes, Johannes (2002). Ocean Waves and Oscillating Systems. Cambridge University Press. ., 288 pp.
 McCormick, Michael (2007). Ocean Wave Energy Conversion. Dover. ., 256 pp.

Wave energy converters